Lapwing was a packet ship built in France in 1762 that the British East India Company acquired. She made two round-trips to India for the company, with the EIC selling her in 1765 in Bengal on her third voyage.

EIC voyages

EIC voyage #1 (1762–63)
Captain John Griffin (or Griffen) left Britain on 5 April 1762, bound for Madras. He returned on 12 March 1763.

EIC voyage #2 (1763–64)
Captain Griffin left Plymouth on Plymouth on 5 April 1763. Lapwing reached Johanna on 22 July, and arrived at Madras on 20 August. Homeward bound, she reached the Cape on 14 November, St Helena on 6 December, and Torbay on 1 February 1764, before arriving at The Downs on 13 February.

EIC voyage #3 (1764–65)
Captain John Griffin started on 28 March 1764, bound for Bengal, but did not leave Portsmouth until 3 June. By 6 December Lapwing had reached Acheh. On 23 January 1765 she arrived at Ingeli,  a point on the west side of the Hooghli Estuary. On 4 April she was at Calcutta. The EIC sold Lapwing there in 1765.

Citations

References
 

1762 ships
Ships of the British East India Company
Age of Sail merchant ships
Merchant ships of the United Kingdom